The 533d Air Defense Group is a disbanded United States Air Force organization. Its last assignment was with the 27th Air Division at Oxnard Air Force Base, California. It was inactivated on 18 August 1955.  The group was originally activated as a support unit for the 483d Bombardment Group at the end of World War II in Italy.

The group was activated once again in 1953, when ADC established it as the headquarters for a dispersed fighter-interceptor squadron and the medical, maintenance, and administrative squadrons supporting it.  It was replaced in 1955 when ADC transferred its mission, equipment, and personnel to the 414th Fighter Group in a project that replaced air defense groups commanding fighter squadrons with fighter groups with distinguished records during World War II.

History

World War II
The group was activated at Sterparone Airfield, Italy as the 533d Air Service Group shortly after VE Day in a reorganization of Army Air Forces (AAF) support groups in which the AAF replaced Service Groups that included personnel from other branches of the Army and supported two combat groups with Air Service Groups including only Air Corps units.  It was designed to support a single combat group. Its 959th Air Engineering Squadron provided maintenance that was beyond the capability of the combat group, its 783rd Air Materiel Squadron handled all supply matters, and its Headquarters & Base Services Squadron provided other support. The 533d supported 483d Bombardment Group in Italy in 1945 until it was inactivated in the fall. The group was disbanded in 1948.

Cold War

The group was reconstituted, redesignated as the 533d Air Defense Group, and activated at Oxnard Air Force Base, California in 1953 with responsibility for air defense of Southern California.  Assigned the 354th Fighter-Interceptor Squadron (FIS), which was already stationed at Oxnard, and flying World War II era F-51 Mustangs as its operational component. The 354th FIS had been assigned directly to the 27th Air Division. The 354th FIS upgraded to F-94 Starfires in July 1953. The group also replaced the 90th Air Base Squadron as USAF host organization at Oxnard. The group was assigned three squadrons to perform its support responsibilities.

The 533d was inactivated and replaced by the 414th Fighter Group (Air Defense) in 1955 as part of Air Defense Command's Project Arrow, which was designed to bring back on the active list the fighter units which had compiled memorable records in the two world wars. the group was disbanded once again in 1984.

Lineage
 Activated as 533rd Air Service Group on 28 May 1945
 Inactivated on 25 September 1945
 Disbanded on 8 October 1948
 Reconstituted and redesignated as 533d Air Defense Group on 21 January 1953
 Activated on 16 February 1953
 Inactivated on 18 August 1955
 Disbanded on 27 September 1984

Assignments
 Unknown, 28 May 1945 – 25 September 1945 (probably XV Air Force Service Command)
 27th Air Division, 16 February 1953 – 18 August 1955

Stations
 Sterperone Airfield, Italy, 28 May 1945 – May 1945
 Pisa, Italy, May 1945 – 25 September 1945
 Oxnard Air Force Base, California, 16 February 1953 – 18 August 1955

Components
Operational Squadron
 354th Fighter-Interceptor Squadron, 16 February 1953 – 18 August 1955
Support Units
 533rd Air Base Squadron, 16 February 1953 – 18 August 1955
 533rd Materiel Squadron, 16 February 1953 – 18 August 1955
 533rd Medical Squadron (later 533rd USAF Dispensary), 16 February 1953 – 18 August 1955
 783rd Air Materiel Squadron, 28 May 1945 – 25 September 1945
 959th Air Engineering Squadron, 28 May 1945 – 25 September 1945

Aircraft
 North American F-51D Mustang, 1953
 Lockheed F-94C Starfighter, 1953–1955

See also
 Aerospace Defense Command Fighter Squadrons
 F-94 Starfire units of the United States Air Force

References

Bibliography

 Buss, Lydus H.(ed), Sturm, Thomas A., Volan, Denys, and McMullen, Richard F., History of Continental Air Defense Command and Air Defense Command July to December 1955, Directorate of Historical Services, Air Defense Command, Ent AFB, CO, (1956)
 
 
 
 

Further reading
 Grant, C.L., (1961)  The Development of Continental Air Defense to 1 September 1954, USAF Historical Study No. 126
 

0533
Aerospace Defense Command units
Military units and formations disestablished in 1984
Military units and formations established in 1953